Al-Arabi is a monthly magazine that focuses mainly on the culture, literature, art, politics, society, and economics of the Arab world.  The first edition was published in December 1958, seeking to propound the ideology of Pan-Arabism. The magazine encourages public participation and makes use of photography and freelance work.

History and profile
Al-Arabi was founded by the Government of Kuwait in an effort to establish a magazine that emphasizes Arabic literature. The monthly magazine has always been financially supported by the Kuwaiti Ministry of Information which is the main regulatory body of media in the country. Ahmad Zaki was selected as the first editor in chief of the magazine and the first publication of the magazine was issued in December 1958.

Since its first days, the magazine has addressed various important issues in both the Arabic and international communities dealing with all aspects of life. Many of the articles published were contributions from well-known authors, artists and poets; such as Abbas el-Akkad, Nizar Qabbani, Sa'id al-Afghani, Abdul Hadi Altazi, Ihsan Abbas, Yusuf Idris, Salah Abdel Sabour and Dalal Almutairi.
The magazine stopped briefly for seven months during the Iraqi occupation of Kuwait from August 1990 to February 1991.

List of Editors in Chief
 1958-1975: Ahmad Zaki
 1976-1982: Ahmad Baha Eldeen
 1982-1999: Muhammad Ganiem Al-Romehe
 1999–2013: Sulaiman Abrahim El-Askari
 2013–2014: Adil Salim Al-Abd Al-Jadir
 2014-present: Ibrahim Al-Mulaifi

References

External links

 Official website

1958 establishments in Kuwait
Arabic-language magazines
History magazines
Magazines published in Kuwait
Literary magazines
Magazines established in 1958
Monthly magazines